Susan Edmondson (born 21 February 1956) is a British former swimmer. Edmondson competed at the 1972 Summer Olympics and the 1976 Summer Olympics. The 1976 British Olympic team for the Women's 200 m freestyle - Swimming event included Susan Barnard, Ann Bradshaw and Edmondson.

She also represented England and won a bronze medal in the 4 x 100 metres freestyle relay, at the 1974 British Commonwealth Games in Christchurch, New Zealand.

References

External links
 

1956 births
Living people
British female swimmers
Olympic swimmers of Great Britain
Swimmers at the 1972 Summer Olympics
Swimmers at the 1976 Summer Olympics
Place of birth missing (living people)
Commonwealth Games medallists in swimming
Commonwealth Games bronze medallists for England
Swimmers at the 1974 British Commonwealth Games
20th-century British women
21st-century British women
Medallists at the 1974 British Commonwealth Games